Rolf Myhre (born 31 October 1939, in Stokke) is a Norwegian politician for the Christian Democratic Party.

He has been the mayor of Molde three times, from 1984 to 1985, 1990 to 1993 and 1998 to 2003. He was also the chief administrator of the Norwegian Academy of Literature and Freedom of Expression.

References

1939 births
Living people
Mayors of places in Møre og Romsdal
Christian Democratic Party (Norway) politicians